Tate House may refer to:

Tate House (Tate, Georgia), listed on the NRHP in Georgia
 Tate House (Ville Platte, Louisiana), listed on the NRHP in Louisiana
Tate House (Portland, Maine), in Stroudwater area of Portland, Maine, listed on the NRHP in Maine
 Franklin Pierce Tate House in Morganton, North Carolina, listed on the NRHP in North Carolina
 Tate House (Morganton, North Carolina), listed on the NRHP in North Carolina